Troponin C, also known as TN-C or  TnC, is a protein that resides in the troponin complex on actin thin filaments of striated muscle (cardiac, fast-twitch skeletal, or slow-twitch skeletal) and is responsible for binding calcium to activate muscle contraction. Troponin C is encoded by the TNNC1 gene in humans for both cardiac and slow skeletal muscle.

Structure 

Cardiac troponin C (cTnC) is a 161-amino acid protein organized into two domains: the regulatory N-terminal domain (cNTnC, residues 1-86), the structural C-terminal domain (cCTnC, residues 93-161), and a flexible linker connecting the two domains (residues 87-92). Each domain contains two EF-hands, Ca2+-binding helix-loop-helix motifs exemplified by proteins like parvalbumin and calmodulin. In cCTnC the two EF-hand motifs constitute two high affinity Ca2+-binding sites. that are occupied at all physiologically relevant calcium concentrations. In contrast, only the second EF-hand in cNTnC binds Ca2+ with low affinity, while the first EF-hand Ca2+-binding site is defunct.

In a typical EF-hand protein like calmodulin, Ca2+ binding induces a closed-to-open conformational transition, exposing a large hydrophobic patch in the open state. Likewise, the cardiac troponin regulatory domain, cNTnC, is in a closed conformation in the apo state (no calcium bound). Upon Ca2+ binding, cNTnC enters into a rapid equilibrium between closed and open forms, however, the closed form still predominates. The structural domain, cCTnC, exists as a "molten globule" in the apo state, but forms a well structured open conformation in the Ca2+-bound state. These structural differences change the relative stabilities of the apo- and Ca2+-bound states, accounting for the divergent Ca2+-binding affinities between the two domains.

Function 

In cardiac muscle, cTnC binds to cardiac troponin I (cTnI) and cardiac troponin T (cTnT), whereas cTnC binds to slow skeletal troponin I (ssTnI) and troponin T (ssTnT) in slow-twitch skeletal muscle.

The structural domain of cTnC (cCTnC) is anchored to troponin I and T, forming the so-called IT arm, made up of cTnC93-161, cTnI41-135 and cTnT235-286 (in the cardiac complex). cCTnC binds to helical cTnI41-60 via its large hydrophobic patch, stabilizing the Ca2+-bound open conformation of cCTnC and enhancing its affinity for Ca2+ (from Kd = 40 nM to Kd = 3 nM). cTnT235-286 forms a helical coiled coil with cTnI88-135 that binds to the opposite face of cCTnC. The IT arm is anchored to tropomyosin via adjacent segments of cTnT, so it is believed to move as a unit along with tropomyosin throughout the cardiac cycle. In the low calcium environment present during diastole (~100 nM), tropomyosin is anchored into the "blocked" position along the actin thin filament through the binding of the troponin I inhibitory (cTnI128-147) and C-terminal (cTnI160-209) regions. This prevents actin-myosin cross-bridging and effectively shuts off muscle contraction.

As the cytoplasmic Ca2+ concentration rises to ~1 μM during systole, Ca2+ binding to the regulatory domain of cardiac troponin C (cNTnC) is the key event that leads to muscle contraction. Hydrophobic binding of cNTnC to the "switch" region of troponin I, cTnI148-159, stabilizes the Ca2+-bound open conformation of cNTnC (increasing the Ca2+ binding affinity of cNTnC from about Kd = 5 μM to Kd = 0.8 μM). This binding event removes the adjacent cTnI inhibitory regions from actin and stabilizes tropomyosin in its default "closed" position on the thin filament, allowing actin-myosin cross-bridging and muscle contraction to proceed. Strong actin-myosin interaction can further shift the thin filament into the "open" position.

Physiologic regulation of calcium sensitivity 

The calcium sensitivity of the sarcomere, that is, the calcium concentration at which muscle contraction occurs, is directly determined by the calcium binding affinity of cNTnC. To date, there are no known post-translational modifications of cTnC that impact its calcium binding affinity. However, calcium binding by cNTnC is a dynamic process that can be impacted by the closed-to-open conformational equilibrium of cNTnC, the domain positioning of cNTnC, or the relative availability of cTnI148-159, the physiologic binding partner of cNTnC. The closed-to-open equilibrium of cNTnC can be shifted towards the open state by small compounds (see section below on troponin-binding drugs). Domain positioning of cNTnC can be impacted by phosphorylation of cTnI, of which the most important site in humans is Ser22/Ser23. The availability of cTnI148-159 depends on the blocked-closed-open equilibrium of tropomyosin on actin, which can be impacted by any interactions involving the thin filament, including actin-myosin cross-bridging and length dependent activation (also known as stretch activation or the Frank Starling law of the heart). All of these processes can be impacted by mutations (see section below on disease-causing mutations).

Disease-causing mutations 

Hypertrophic cardiomyopathy (HCM) is a common condition (prevalence >1:500) characterized by abnormal thickening of the ventricular muscle, classically in the intraventricular septal wall. HCM is described as a disease of the sarcomere, because mutations in the contractile proteins of the sarcomere have been identified in about half of patients with HCM. The cTnC mutations that have been associated with HCM are A8V, L29Q, A31S, C84Y, D145E. In all cases, the mutation was identified in a single patient, so additional genetic testing is needed to confirm or refute the clinical significance of these mutations. With most of these mutations (and with HCM-associated thin filament mutations in general), an increase in cardiac calcium sensitivity has been observed.

Familial dilated cardiomyopathy (DCM) is a rare cause of systolic heart failure (prevalence 1:5000). A wider range of mutations (including some non-sarcomeric proteins as well) is associated with DCM. The cTnC mutations associated with DCM thus far are Y5H, Q50R, D75Y, M103I, D145E (also associated with HCM), I148V, and G159D. Of these, Q50R and G159D co-segregated with disease in affected family members, increasing confidence that they are clinically significant mutations. The biochemical consequences of thin filament DCM-associated mutations are less well established than for HCM, although there has been some suggestion that some of the mutations abolish the calcium desensitizing effect of cTnI phosphorylation at Ser22/23. This may be because some mutations disrupt the precise positioning of cNTnC for triggering muscle contraction when cTnI is unphosphorylated.

Troponin-binding drugs 

Chemical compounds can bind to troponin C to act as troponin activators (calcium sensitizers) or troponin inhibitors (calcium desensitizers). There are already multiple troponin activators that bind to fast skeletal troponin C, of which tirasemtiv has been tested in multiple clinical trials. In contrast, there are no known compounds that bind with high affinity to cardiac troponin C. The calcium sensitizer, levosimendan, is purported to bind to troponin C, but only weak or inconsistent binding has been detected, precluding any structure determination. In contrast, levosimendan inhibits type 3 phosphodiesterase with nanomolar affinity, so its biological target is controversial.

Some compounds have been identified to bind cNTnC with low affinity and act as troponin activators: DFBP-O (a structural analog of levosimendan), 4-(4-(2,5-dimethylphenyl)-1-piperazinyl)-3-pyridinamine (NCI147866), and bepridil. The calmodulin antagonist, W7, has also been found to bind to cNTnC to act as a troponin inhibitor. All of these compounds bind to the hydrophobic patch in the open conformation of cNTnC, with troponin activators promoting interaction with the cTnI switch peptide and troponin inhibitors destabilizing the interaction.

A number of compounds can also bind to cCTnC with low affinity: EMD 57033, resveratrol, bepridil, and EGCG. All of these compounds are renowned for their promiscuity, and the biological significance of these interactions is unknown. In particular, it is unknown how interaction with cCTnC influences the calcium affinity of cNTnC.

Theoretically, a cardiac troponin activator could be useful for increasing cardiac contractility in the treatment of systolic heart failure, whereas a troponin inhibitor could be used to favor relaxation in the treatment of diastolic heart failure. Troponin modulators could also be used to reverse the impact of cardiomyopathy-causing mutations in the thin filament.

Notes

References

External links 
 Mass spectrometry characterization of human TNNC1 at COPaKB.
  GeneReviews/NIH/NCBI/UW entry on Familial Hypertrophic Cardiomyopathy Overview
 

EF-hand-containing proteins